Aleksandra Račić (born September 19, 1990) is a Serbian female basketball player.

References

External links
Profile at eurobasket.com

1990 births
Living people
Sportspeople from Kraljevo
Serbian women's basketball players
Guards (basketball)
ŽKK Vojvodina players
ŽKK Šumadija Kragujevac players